Addington was a provincial electoral riding in Ontario, Canada. It was created in 1867 at the time of confederation and was abolished in 1954 before the 1955 election.

Boundaries
In 1867, the boundaries included the Townships of Camden, Portland, Sheffield, Hinchinbrooke, Kaladar, Kennebec, Olden, Oso, Anglesea, Barrie, Clarendon, Palmerston, Effingham, Abinger, Miller, Canonto, Denbigh, Loughborough and Bedford.

In 1885, the boundaries were changed to include the Townships of Abinger, Anglesea, Ashby, Camden, Denbigh, Effingham, Kaladar, Sheffield, and the Village of Newburgh in  Lennox and Addington County, and the townships of Barrie, North Canonto, South Canonto, Clarendon, Hinchinbrooke, Kennebec, Loughborough, Miller, Olden, Oso, Palmerston and Portland in Frontenac County.

In 1925, the boundaries were changed to include the Townships of Abinger, Anglesea, Ashby, Camden, Denbigh, Effingham, Kaladar, Sheffield and the Village of Newburgh in the County of Lennox aud Addington and the Townships of Barrie, Bedford, North Canonto, South Canonto, Clarendon, Hinchinbrooke, Kennebec, Loughborough, Pittsburg, Miller, Olden, Oso, Palmerston and Portland in the County of Frontenac.

Members of Provincial Parliament

Election results

References

Former provincial electoral districts of Ontario